The Amiot 354 was the last in a series of fast, twin-engine bombers which fought with the French Air Force in limited numbers during the Battle of France.

Development

The Amiot 350 series originated in the same 1934 requirement as a rival to the Lioré et Olivier LeO 451. Derived from the Amiot 341 mail plane, the Amiot 340 prototype was involved in a propaganda flight to Berlin in August 1938 to convince the Germans that the French employed modern bombers. Though 130 machines were ordered by the French government that year, production delays and modifications ensured that by September 1939 none had been delivered. 830 of this very modern aircraft were eventually ordered but only 80 machines were received by the Air Ministry. The main variant was the twin-tailed 351; due to delays, the single-tailed 354 was accepted into service as an interim type. The Amiot 351 was intended to carry a  MAC 1934 machine gun in nose and ventral positions and a  Hispano-Suiza HS.404 cannon in the dorsal position. Due to technical problems with the armament installation, many aircraft went to operational units with only a rifle-calibre machine-gun in the dorsal position.

Operational history
In May 1940, the Amiot 351/354 was in the process of equipping just two bomber groupes: GB 1/21 and GB II/21 based at Avignon. Though 200 were in the final stages of construction, only 35 were ready for flight. This situation was exacerbated by the Amiot 351/354 being built in three factories, two of which were later bombed by the Germans. On 16 May 1940, the Amiot 351/354s carried out armed reconnaissance sorties over Maastricht in the Netherlands - the first operation conducted by planes of this type. By June, the Amiot 351/354 was also delivered for GB I/34 and GB II/34, neither flying them in combat. At that time, all Amiot 351/354s were based on the northern front. Three had been lost in combat and ten in training accidents. All aircraft were ordered to evacuate to Africa on 17 June, 37 surviving the trip. As their numbers were too few to engage the Italians, the aircraft were sent back to Metropolitan France and their groupes disbanded in August 1940. Five Amiot 351/354s continued to be used as mail planes after the Battle of France. Four Amiot 351/354s were commandeered by the Luftwaffe as transports, two found service in the 1./Kampfgeschwader 200 a special service unit. Engines taken from these aircraft were later used on Messerschmitt Me 323 cargo transports.

Variants

Amiot 340.01
Two 686 kW (920 hp) Gnome-Rhône 14P, single-tail prototype (one built)

Amiot 350
 351 re-engined with two 686 kW (920 hp) Hispano-Suiza 12Y-28 / Hispano-Suiza 12Y-29 engines (one built)

Amiot 351.01
 Amiot 351 prototype.

Amiot 351
 Two 707 kW (950 hp) Gnome-Rhône 14N-38 / Gnome-Rhône 14N-39, twin-tail (17) (This number may be low)

Amiot 352
 351 re-engined with two 820 kW (1,100 hp) Hispano-Suiza 12Y-50 / Hispano-Suiza 12Y-51 engines (one built)

Amiot 353
 351 re-engined with two 768 kW (1,030 hp) Rolls-Royce Merlin III engines (one built)

Amiot 354
 351 re-engined with two 798 kW (1,070 hp) Gnome-Rhône 14N-48 / Gnome-Rhône 14N-49, most with single-tail. (45) (This number is probably low)

Amiot 355.01
 351 re-engined with two 895 kW (1,200 hp) Gnome-Rhône 14R-2 / Gnome-et-Rhone 14R-3 engines (one built)

Amiot 356.01
 354 re-engined with two 842 kW (1,130 hp) Rolls-Royce Merlin X engines (one built)

Amiot 357
 high-altitude prototype with pressurized cabin, two 895 kW (1,200 hp) Hispano-Suiza 12Z-89 turbocharged engines (one built)

Amiot 358
 351 re-engined post-war with two 895 kW (1,200 hp) Pratt & Whitney R-1830 engines (one built)

Amiot 370
 single-tail racer with two 642 kW (860 hp) Hispano-Suiza 12Yirs / Hispano-Suiza 12Yjrs engines, developed specifically for (later cancelled) Paris-New York race (one built)

Operators
 
 Armee de l'Air
 
 Luftwaffe

Specifications (Amiot 354 B4)

See also

Notes

Bibliography
 Breffort, Dominique & Jouineau, André. French Aircraft from 1939 to 1942

 Green, William. War Planes of the Second World War: Volume Seven Bombers and Reconnaissance Aircraft. London:Macdonald, 1967.
 Weal, Elke C., Weal, John A., Barker, Richard F. Combat Aircraft of World War Two
 Various issues of Avions magazine

External links

 http://www.avions-bateaux.com

354
1930s French bomber aircraft
Twin piston-engined tractor aircraft